The Kansas City Tribe is a football team in the Women's Football Alliance based in Kansas City, Missouri. Home games are played at Center High School.

History

2008
Founded by Colin Stoner, John Van Sittert, and Mindy White, the Tribe began as a member of the Independent Women's Football League and was their return to the Kansas City market after the Kansas City Storm left for the NWFA. In their inaugural season, the Tribe finished at 4-4, good for second place in the Mid-South Division.

2009
The Tribe's breakout year would be its sophomore one, however.  Finishing at 7–1, the Tribe clinched its first ever playoff spot and Midwest Division title.  In the storm-heavy first-round game against the Los Angeles Amazons, the Tribe was trailing 14-6 late in the fourth quarter; however, late heroics would give them the 19–14 win, paving the way for the Western Conference title game against division rival Chicago Force (at whose hands the Tribe endured its only defeat of the regular season).  That game was much more lopsided, with the Tribe pulling out the 40–16 win and the Western Conference championship.  The Tribe won the IWFL Tier I World Championship on July 25, defeating the previously unbeaten Eastern Conference champion D.C. Divas, 21–18, at Round Rock ISD Athletic Stadium in Round Rock, Texas (a suburb of Austin).

2010
Although they finished 6–2, that was still not enough for a playoff berth (missing by .028 percentage points), finishing third in the Midwest Division behind the Dallas Diamonds and Chicago Force.

2011
In the Tribe's first WFA season, they finished 7–1, good for the Midwest Division title and a return trip to the playoffs.  After defeating the Minnesota Machine 51–0 in the first round, the Tribe fell to the Dallas Diamonds 20–23 in an epic battle decided in overtime.

Season-By-Season

|-
| colspan="6" align="center" | Kansas City Tribe (IWFL)
|-
|2008 || 4 || 4 || 0 || 2nd Tier I West Mid-South || --
|-
|2009 || 7 || 1 || 0  || 1st Tier I West Midwest || Won Western Conference Semifinal (Los Angeles)Won Western Conference Championship (Chicago)Won IWFL Tier I World Championship (D.C.)
|-
|2010 || 6 || 2 || 0  || 3rd Tier I West Midwest || --
|-
| colspan="6" align="center" | Kansas City Tribe (WFA)
|-
|2011 || 7 || 1 || 0 || 1st American Midwest || Won American Conference Quarterfinal (Minnesota)Lost American Conference Semifinal (Dallas)
|-
|2012* || 7 || 1 || 0 || -- || Won American Conference Quarterfinal (Kansas City)Lost American Conference Semifinal (Dallas)
|-
!Totals || 36 || 11 || 0
|colspan="2"|(including playoffs)

* = Current standing

2009

Season schedule

2010

Season schedule

2011

Standings

Season schedule

2012

Season schedule

External links
 Kansas City Tribe

Women's Football Alliance teams
American football teams in Missouri
Sports in the Kansas City metropolitan area
American football teams established in 2008
2008 establishments in Missouri